The Heron and the Crane (Tsaplya i zhuravl) is a 1974 10-minute  Soviet/Russian animated film directed by Yuri Norstein and produced by the Soyuzmultfilm.

Summary
Based on the folk tale about the unlucky never-ending courtship of the title characters (a male crane and a female heron, each changing their own minds).

Cast 

 Innokenty Smoktunovsky as Narrator's voice

References

External links
 The Heron and the Crane at Yuri Norstein's official website 

 The Heron and the Crane on MUBI
 The Heron and the Crane on Letterboxd
 

1974 animated films
1974 short films
Films directed by Yuri Norstein
Russian animated short films
Soviet animated short films
Soyuzmultfilm
Animated films about birds
Films based on Russian folklore